Mansurabad (also Romanized as Manşūrābād) is a village in Deris Rural District, in the Central District of Kazerun County, Fars Province, Iran. At the 2006 census, its population was 22, in 6 families.

References 

Populated places in Kazerun County